Miss Gay Memphis, which was originally called Miss Memphis Review, was the first drag or Female impersonation pageantry event in Memphis, Tennessee. The first Miss Gay Memphis event was held in the Guild Theatre, which is now called The Evergreen Theatre, on October 31, 1969 by the owner Bill Kendall.

The Event 
The Miss Gay Memphis Pageant is an event where men impersonate women and compete in several rounds with judges. At times cash and other various prizes were offered to the winner and runner ups that get selected by these judges.

History 

In Memphis and America as a whole during the 1950's and the 1960's being apart or associating with the LGBTQ community was considered taboo. People in the LGBTQ+ community were afraid that if they were caught doing events, like drag shows, that they would be labeled as "degenerates, perverts, and deviants" or be arrested and have that arrest be published in the paper for everyone to see. During the 1950's and the 1960's cross-dressing was illegal and could result in arrest but on Halloween, it could be argued that it is only a costume which is why the first Miss Gay Memphis event was set during Halloween. Bill Kendall, manager of the Guild Theatre, set up this event and brought real girls into the audience to deter possible police raids that some of the people were worried about happening. Despite the worries no raids did end up taking place and the event went as planned. On October 23, 2019, 50 years later, a historic marker was placed outside of the Evergreen to honor this event taking place.

References

LGBT events in the United States